Kerry Harris (born 19 September 1949) is an Australian former professional tennis player, active from 1967 to 1975, who reached the semi-final of the 1972 Australian Open, and reached four Grand Slam doubles finals, of which she won one, in the 1972 Australian Open.

Career
Kerry's early years were spent under the guidance of J Hildebrands (Snr), before being coached by Harry Hopman and trained by Stan Nicholes. In 1968, Harris started on the International tour, the first year in the open era, and she was chosen to be a part of Lawn Tennis Association of Australia's Touring Team with Harry Hopman as manager. She later was coached by Merv Rose.

Kerry first reached a Grand Slam final in the 1971 French Open Women's Doubles, partnering Helen Gourlay, which they lost in two sets to defending champions Françoise Dürr and Gail Chanfreau.

Kerry won the final of the 1972 Australian Open Women's Doubles tournament partnered with Helen Gourlay, beating Patricia Coleman-Clegg and Karen Krantzcke. In the women's singles, seeded number 6, she reached the semifinals, losing to eventual champion Virginia Wade in three sets. 

She reached the women's doubles final of the 1973 Australian Open and 1974 Australian Open partnering Kerry Melville on both occasions. In 1973, Margaret Court and Virginia Wade won the final, and in 1974, Evonne Goolagong and Peggy Michel won.

Kerry had wins in her career over Margaret Court, Nancy Richey, Kerry Melville, Judy Dalton, Wendy Turnbull, Betty Stöve, and Francoise Durr. She was described as an athletic player, with a very powerful serve-and-volley game. She was praised for her good temperament on and off the court.

After her tennis career ended, she became a tennis coach.

Grand Slam finals

Doubles (1 title, 3 runner-ups)

Other tournaments

Singles (1 title, 4 runner-ups)

Doubles (7 titles)

External links

 
 

1949 births
Living people
Australian Open (tennis) champions
Australian female tennis players
Grand Slam (tennis) champions in women's doubles
Tennis players from Melbourne